Suzanne Teriimarama Bambridge (1844–1911) was a leading social figure in Tahiti in the late nineteenth century.

Life 
Bambridge was the daughter of Thomas Bambridge and Maraea Haumani O'Connor. Her English father was a missionary in Papeete and Tahitian-Irish O'Connor was his second wife. In 1891 French artist Paul Gauguin, recently arrived in Papeete, secured a commission to paint Bambridge's portrait.

Her great-grandfather, James O'Conner, had  been a sailor aboard the whaler , which had wrecked on Moruroa on 25 May 1792. The crew had survived and reached Tahiti on 5 March. O'Conner and a handful of other survivors declined later opportunities to return to Britain, preferring to settle in Tahiti.

References 

1844 births
1911 deaths
People from Tahiti
Tahitian women
French Polynesian people of English descent